K. Appalaraju was an Indian professional football player. He was part of the Indian Squad that finished runners-up in 1964 AFC Asian Cup. He scored a goal in a 2–0 win over South Korea in 1964 Asian Cup. He also scored a hat-trick in a 5–3 win over Sri Lanka in 1964 Summer Olympics Football tournament qualification.

Honours

India
AFC Asian Cup runners-up: 1964

Individual
 Calcutta Football League top scorer: 1959 (with 24 goals)

References

Indian footballers
India international footballers
1964 AFC Asian Cup players
Sportspeople from Visakhapatnam
Footballers from Andhra Pradesh
Possibly living people
Year of birth missing
Association football forwards
Calcutta Football League players